Sigune (minor planet designation: 502 Sigune) is a minor planet orbiting the Sun. Like 501 Urhixidur and 500 Selinur, it is named after a character in Friedrich Theodor Vischer's then-bestseller satirical novel Auch Einer.

References

External links 
 
 

000502
Discoveries by Max Wolf
Named minor planets
000502
19030119